The men's 200 m butterfly event at the 2015 European Games in Baku took place on 24 and 25 June at the Aquatic Palace.

Results

Heats
The heats were started on 24 June at 10:15.

Semifinals
The semifinals were started on 24 June at 18:47.

Semifinal 1

Semifinal 2

Final
The final was held on 25 June at 17:44.

References

Men's 200 metre butterfly